The New Milford School District is a comprehensive community public school district that serves students in kindergarten through twelfth grade from New Milford, in Bergen County, New Jersey, United States.

As of the 2018–19 school year, the district, comprising four schools, had an enrollment of 2,026 students and 157.4 classroom teachers (on an FTE basis), for a student–teacher ratio of 12.9:1.

The district is classified by the New Jersey Department of Education as being in District Factor Group "FG", the fourth-highest of eight groupings. District Factor Groups organize districts statewide to allow comparison by common socioeconomic characteristics of the local districts. From lowest socioeconomic status to highest, the categories are A, B, CD, DE, FG, GH, I and J.

Schools
Schools in the district (with 2018–19 enrollment data from the National Center for Education Statistics) are:
Elementary schools
Berkley Street School with 436 students in grades K-5
Timothy Coughlin, Principal
Bertram F. Gibbs Elementary School with 484 students in grades K-5
Jessica Torre, Principal
Middle school
David E. Owens Middle School with 510 students in grades 6-8
James DeLalla, Principal
High school
New Milford High School with 601 students in grades 9-12
Lou Manuppelli, Principal

In the news
Two students were removed from school after a March 2007 incident in which a sixth-grade student brought a BB gun to Owens Middle School, showed it to other students and hid the gun in another student's locker.

Administration
Core members of the district's administration are:
Danielle Shanley, Superintendent
Stephanie Kuchar, Business Administrator / Board Secretary

Board of education
The district's board of education, with nine members, sets policy and oversees the fiscal and educational operation of the district through its administration. As a Type II school district, the board's trustees are elected directly by voters to serve three-year terms of office on a staggered basis, with three seats up for election each year held (since 2012) as part of the November general election. The board appoints a superintendent to oversee the day-to-day operation of the district.

References

External links
New Milford School District

School Data for the New Milford School District, National Center for Education Statistics

New Jersey District Factor Group FG
New Milford, New Jersey
School districts in Bergen County, New Jersey